Francis Thomas Murray (July 21, 1915 – June 28, 1998) was an American football player and college athletics administrator. He played professionally as a halfback and punter in the National Football League (NFL) for the Philadelphia Eagles from 1939 to 1940. Murray played college football at the University of Pennsylvania and was drafted in the second round of the 1937 NFL Draft. He served as the athletic director at his alma mater, Penn, from 1950 to 1953.

Murray died on June 28, 1998, at his home in Boca Raton, Florida, from complications of a stroke he had suffered four years prior.

References

External links
 

1915 births
1998 deaths
All-American college men's basketball players
American football halfbacks
American football punters
American men's basketball players
Basketball players from Pennsylvania
Penn Quakers athletic directors
Penn Quakers football players
Penn Quakers men's basketball players
Philadelphia Eagles players
People from Glenolden, Pennsylvania
Players of American football from Pennsylvania